Windemere may refer to:

 Windemere Township, Minnesota
 Windemere, North Carolina, a census designated place (CDP)
 Windemere, Texas, a CDP
 Windemere (Walloon Lake), the Hemingway home on Walloon Lake in northern Michigan, listed on the National Register of Historic Places

See also
 Windermere (disambiguation) 
 Windamere (disambiguation)